Antennatus duescus, the side-jet frogfish, is a species of fish in the family Antennariidae. It is native to the Pacific Ocean, where it is known from the Hawaiian Islands, Indonesia, New Caledonia, and Papua New Guinea. It typically occurs at a depth range of 59 to 79 m (194 to 259 ft), although it may be found as far down as 137 m (449 ft), although it has also reportedly been collected in environments less than 30 m (98 ft) deep according to FishBase. It is a very small fish that is only known to reach 3 cm (1.2 in) SL. This species is benthic and oviparous.

References 

Antennariidae
Taxa named by John Otterbein Snyder
Fish of the Pacific Ocean
Fish described in 1904